Sugar Creek is a stream in Pike County in the U.S. state of Missouri. It is a tributary of the Salt River.

Sugar Creek was so named on account of sugar maple timber near its course.

See also
List of rivers of Missouri

References

Rivers of Pike County, Missouri
Rivers of Missouri